Angela Piper is an English actress who is best known for her portrayal of Jennifer Aldridge in the BBC radio drama The Archers, a role she played from 1963 to 2023. Piper had not appeared in the programme for some months before the character died on 22 January 2023, as Piper had decided to retire from the role.

She attended Parkfield Cedars School in Derby and then Ashby de la Zouch Girls' School, where she was encouraged to pursue a career in acting.

Piper appeared in the ITV series Life Begins at Forty and Third Time Lucky in the 1980s. From 1963 she voiced Jennifer in The Archers, and she was as of 2022 the third-longest serving current soap star worldwide.

She is married to Peter Bolgar, a former announcer at the BBC.

References

Living people
Year of birth missing (living people)
20th-century English actresses
English soap opera actresses